Gol Chini (also Romanized as Gol Chīnī) is a village in Esfivard-e Shurab Rural District, in the Central District of Sari County, Mazandaran Province, Iran. At the 2006 census, its population was 689, in 168 families.

References 

Populated places in Sari County